Sabazia is a genus of Colombian and Mesoamerican plants in the tribe Millerieae within the family Asteraceae.

 Species
 Sabazia acoma (S.F.Blake) Longpre - Colombia
 Sabazia densa Longpre - Costa Rica
 Sabazia durangensis (Longpre) Urbatsch & B.L.Turner - Durango, Sinaloa
 Sabazia elata (Canne) B.L.Turner - Querétaro
 Sabazia glandulosa (Canne) B.L.Turner - Querétaro
 Sabazia humilis (Kunth) Cass. - Michoacán, Oaxaca, Morelos, D.F., Chiapas, Hidalgo, Puebla
 Sabazia leavenworthii Longpre - Michoacán
 Sabazia macdonaldii B.L.Turner - Oaxaca
 Sabazia microspermoides Longpre - Guerrero
 Sabazia mullerae S.F.Blake - Nuevo León 
 Sabazia multiradiata (Seaton) Longpre - Oaxaca, Puebla, México State
 Sabazia palmeri (S.Watson ex A.Gray) Urbatsch & B.L.Turner - Michoacán, Jalisco
 Sabazia pinetorum S.F.Blake - Guatemala
 Sabazia purpusii Brandegee - Baja California Sur
 Sabazia sarmentosa Less. - from Veracruz to Panamá
 Sabazia trianae (Hieron.) Longpre - Colombia

 formerly included
numerous species formerly considered as part of Sabazia but now regarded as more suited to other genera: Alepidocline Alloispermum Galinsoga Jaegeria Selloa

References

Millerieae
Asteraceae genera